The Pink House is a historic home located at Kansas City, Missouri.  It was designed by architect Mary Rockwell Hook and built in 1922.  It became known as the "Pink House" for its pink plaster exterior, which was a reference to San Francisco, whose 1915 world fair Hook had visited. It is a two-story dwelling with stucco walls, red clay roofing tile, three balconies, and brick chimney with an arcaded, roofed opening atop its stack.

It was listed on the National Register of Historic Places in 1983.

References

Houses on the National Register of Historic Places in Missouri
Houses completed in 1922
Houses in Kansas City, Missouri
National Register of Historic Places in Kansas City, Missouri